Marion Welter (born 1965) is a Luxembourgish singer. When she was 15 years old, she became part of the band Quo vadis. She studied music in a music academy and has worked in several styles of music, such as classical music, pop and jazz.

She represented Luxembourg with the band Kontinent in the Eurovision Song Contest 1992 in Malmö, performing the Luxembourgish song "Sou fräi" (As free). The song ended the contest in 21st place (out of 23 contestants) with 10 points. Before and during her performance, she had an acute attack of malaria that seemed like a severe migraine. She became infected with malaria during a vacation in Kenya in 1990.

References

External links
 Marion Welter's web site

1965 births
Living people
20th-century Luxembourgian women singers
Eurovision Song Contest entrants for Luxembourg
Eurovision Song Contest entrants of 1992